Concho Lake is an irrigation reservoir situated in the town of Concho, in the eastern Arizona grasslands at . Much of the surrounding land is privately owned; the rest is owned by the Bureau of Land Management, but is managed for sport fisheries and wildlife resources by the Arizona Game and Fish.

Description
Concho Lake is a small, shallow, weedy lake. A small watershed and nearby spring feed the lake. Following current management plans, the Arizona Game and Fish stocks catchable-sized rainbow trout during spring months. Green sunfish and an occasional largemouth bass also occur at this lake. The lake gets drawn down considerably in the summer for irrigation.

Fish species
 Rainbow
 Largemouth Bass
 Sunfish

References

External links
 Arizona Boating Locations Facilities Map
 Arizona Fishing Locations Map

Reservoirs in Apache County, Arizona
Bureau of Land Management areas in Arizona
Reservoirs in Arizona